is a passenger railway station located in Tsurumi-ku, Yokohama, Kanagawa Prefecture, Japan, operated by the private railway company Keikyū.

Lines
Namamugi Station is served by the Keikyū Main Line and is located 16.9 kilometers from the terminus of the line at Shinagawa  Station in Tokyo.

Station layout
The station consists of single island platform and a single side platform serving three tracks, with the middle track on a passing loop,  connected by an elevated station building built over the platforms and tracks.

Station layout

History
Namamugi Station opened on 24 December 1905. The station was rebuilt as an elevated station in November 1967.

Keikyū introduced station numbering to its stations on 21 October 2010; Namamugi Station was assigned station number KK31.

Passenger statistics
In fiscal 2019, the station was used by an average of 29,910 passengers daily. 

The passenger figures for previous years are as shown below.

Surrounding area
 Yokohama College of Commerce Tsurumi Campus
 Hosei University International High School
 Yokohama City Kishiya Elementary School
 Yokohama City Namamugi Elementary School
 Yokohama City Namamugi Junior High School

See also
 List of railway stations in Japan

References

External links

 

Railway stations in Kanagawa Prefecture
Railway stations in Japan opened in 1905
Keikyū Main Line
Railway stations in Yokohama